Charles James Ogletree Jr. (born December 31, 1952) is an American attorney, law professor and the Jesse Climenko Professor at Harvard Law School, the founder of the school's Charles Hamilton Houston Institute for Race and Justice.  He is also the author of books on legal topics.

Education
Ogletree was born in Merced, central California. He earned both his BA (1974, with distinction) and MA (1975) in political science from Stanford University and his JD from Harvard Law School in 1978.

Career

Lawyer and professor
After graduating from law school, Ogletree worked for the District of Columbia Public Defender Service until 1985, first as a staff attorney, then as training director, trial chief, and deputy director. As an attorney, he has represented such notable figures as Tupac Shakur and Anita Hill In 1985, he became a professor at Harvard Law School. In 1992, he became the Jesse Climenko Professor of Law and vice dean for clinical programs.

Media appearances and contributions
Moderator of television programs, including State of the Black Union; Where Do We Go from Here: Chaos or Community; (with others) Ethics in America; Hard Drugs, Hard Choices, Liberty and Limits: Whose Law, Whose Order?; Credibility in the Newsroom, Race to Execution, 2006; Beyond Black and White; Liberty & Limits: Whose Law, Whose Order?; That Delicate Balance II: Our Bill of Rights; and other Public Broadcasting Service broadcasts.

Television programs he has been a guest on include Nightline, This Week with David Brinkley, McNeil-Lehrer News Hour, Crossfire, Today Show, Good Morning America, Larry King Live, Cochran and Company :Burden of Proof, Tavis Smiley, Frontline, America's Black Forum, and Meet the Press

On NBC news radio, he was a legal commentator on the O. J. Simpson murder case.

He contributed to periodicals such as New Crisis, Public Utilities Fortnightly, and Harvard Law Review.

In February 2011, he gave a three-part lecture at Harvard Law School entitled "Understanding Obama", which provides an inside look at President Barack Obama's journey from boyhood in Hawaii to the White House.

Ogletree appears in the 2013 documentary film, Justice is a Black Woman: The Life and Works of Constance Baker Motley and in the 2014 documentary, Hate Crimes in the Heartland, providing an analysis of the Tulsa Race Riots.

Community and professional affairs
He was a member of the board of trustees at Stanford University. He founded the Merced, California scholarships. He was the chairman of the board of trustees of University of the District of Columbia. He used to be the national president of the Black Law Students Association.

Stature and public life
Ogletree taught both Barack and Michelle Obama at Harvard; he has remained close to Barack Obama throughout his political career. 

Ogletree has written opinion pieces on the state of race in the United States for major publications. Ogletree also served as the moderator for a panel discussion on civil rights in baseball on March 28, 2008, that accompanied the second annual Major League Baseball civil rights exhibition game the following day between the New York Mets and the Chicago White Sox.

On July 21, 2009, Ogletree issued a statement in response to the arrest of his Harvard colleague and client, Professor Henry Louis Gates, Jr., whose arrest at his own home became a major news story about the nexus of politics, police power, and race that summer. Professor Ogletree later wrote a book about the events titled The Presumption of Guilt: The Arrest of Henry Louis Gates, Jr. and Race, Class and Crime in America.

He is a founder of the Benjamin Banneker Charter Public School and served on the school's foundation board. The school library is named in his honor.

Health
In 2014, Ogletree's wife started noticing health issues when he was 60 years old and he was diagnosed with Alzheimer's disease at age 62 in May 2015. 
On July 13, 2016, Ogletree announced he had been diagnosed with early-stage Alzheimer's disease.  In 2019, Ogletree went missing and was found safe by the police after an extensive missing persons search.

Plagiarism
In 2004 Harvard disciplined Ogletree for the plagiarism of six paragraphs from Yale scholar Jack Balkin's book, What Brown v. Board of Education Should Have Said in his own book, All Deliberate Speed: Reflections on the First Half-Century of Brown v. Board of Education. Ogletree apologized, saying that he "made a serious mistake during the editorial process of completing this book, and delegated too much responsibility to others during the final editing process." Former Harvard President Derek C. Bok concluded, "There was no deliberate wrongdoing at all ... He marshaled his assistants and parceled out the work and in the process some quotation marks got lost."

Awards and honors
He received the National Conference on Black Lawyers People's Lawyer of the Year Award, the Man of Vision Award, Museum of Afro-American History (Boston), the Albert Sacks-Paul A. Freund Award for Teaching Excellence, Harvard Law School in 1993, the Ellis Island Medal of Honor, 1995, the Ruffin-Fenwick Trailblazer Award, and the 21st Century Achievement Award, Urban League of Eastern Massachusetts.

In 2017, the Charles J. Ogletree Jr. Chair in Race and Criminal Justice was established at Harvard Law School in his honor.

Works

Books 
 The Presumption of Guilt: The Arrest of Henry Louis Gates, Jr. and Race, Class and Crime in America (Palgrave-Macmillan 2010)
 When Law Fails (Charles J. Ogletree & Austin Sarat eds.)
 From Lynch Mobs to the Killing State: Race and the Death Penalty in America (ed. with Austin Sarat, New York University Press 2006)
 All Deliberate Speed: Reflections on the First Half-Century of Brown v. Board of Education (W.W. Norton & Company 2004)
 Brown at 50: The Unfinished Legacy (ed. with Deborah L. Rhode, American Bar Association 2004)
 Beyond the Rodney King Story: An Investigation of Police Conduct in Minority Communities (ed. with others, Northeastern University Press Boston, Massachusetts 1995)

Book chapters 
 Faith of Our Fathers: African-American Men Reflect on Fatherhood ed. by Andre C. Willis
 Reason and Passion: Justice Brennan's Enduring Influence
 Lift Every Voice and Sing, 2001
 The Rehnquist Court: Judicial Activism on the Right, 2002.
 Ogletree, Charles J. "The Rehnquist Revolution in Criminal Procedure" in The Rehnquist Court (Herman Schwartz ed., Hill and Wang Publishing, 2002).
 Ogletree, Charles J. "The Challenge of Race and Education" in How to Make Black America Better (Smiley ed., 2001).
 Ogletree, Charles J. "Privileges and Immunities for Basketball Stars and Other Sport Heroes?" in Basketball Jones (Boyd & Shropshire eds., 2000).
 Ogletree, Charles J. "The Tireless Warrior for Racial Justice" in Reason (Rosenkranz & Schwartz eds., 1998).

Articles 
 Ogletree, Charles J. "Commentary: All Deliberate Speed: Reflections on the First Half-Century of Brown vs. Board of Education". 66 Montana Law Review 283 (2005).
 Ogletree, Charles J. "All Deliberate Speed?: Brown's Past and Brown's Future". 107 West Virginia Law Review 625 (2005).
 Ogletree, Charles J. "The Current Reparations Debate". 5 University of California Davis Law Review 36 (2003).
 Ogletree, Charles J. "Does America Owe Us? (Point-Counterpoint with E.R. Shipp, on the Topic of Reparations)". Essence Magazine. February 2003.
 Ogletree, Charles J. "The Case for Reparations". USA Weekend Magazine. February 2003.
 Ogletree, Charles J. "Repairing the Past: New Efforts in the Reparations Debate in America". 2 Harvard Civil Rights- Civil Liberties Law Review 38 (2003).
 Ogletree, Charles J. "Reparations for the Children of Slaves: Litigating the Issues". 2 University of Memphis Law Review 33 (2003).
 Ogletree, Charles J. "The Right's and Wrongs of e-Privacy". Optimize Magazine. March 2002.
 Ogletree, Charles J. "From Pretoria to Philadelphia: Judge Higginbotham's Racial Justice Jurisprudence on South Africa and the United States". 20 Yale Law and Policy Review 383 (2002).
 Ogletree, Charles J. "The Challenge of Providing Legal Representation in the United States, South Africa and China". 7 Washington University Journal of Law and Policy 47 (2002).
 Ogletree, Charles J. "Judicial Activism or Judicial Necessity: D.C. Court's Criminal Justice Legacy". 90 Georgetown Law Journal 685 (2002).
 Ogletree, Charles J. "Black Man's Burden: Race and the Death Penalty in America". 81 Oregon Law Review 15 (2002).
 Ogletree, Charles J. "A Diverse Workforce in the 21st Century: Harvard's Challenge". Harvard Community Resource. Spring 2002.
 Ogletree, Charles J. "Fighting a Just War Without an Unjust Loss of Freedom," Africana.com, October 11, 2001.
 Ogletree, Charles J. "Unequal Justice for Al Sharpton". Africana.com, August 21, 2001.
 Ogletree, Charles J. "A. Leon Higginbotham, Jr.: A Reciprocal Legacy of Scholarship and Advocacy". 53 Rutgers Law Review 665 (2001).
 Ogletree, Charles J. "An Ode to St. Peter: Professor Peter M. Cicchino". 50 American University Law Review 591 (2001).
 Ogletree, Charles J. "America's Schizophrenic Immigration Policy: Race, Class, and Reason". 41 Boston College Law Review 755 (2000).
 Ogletree, Charles J. "A Tribute to Gary Bellow: The Visionary Clinical Scholar". 114 Harvard Law Review 420 (2000).
 Ogletree, Charles J. "A. Leon Higginbotham's Civil Rights Legacy". 34 Harvard Civil-Rights Civil Liberties Law Review 1 (1999).
 Ogletree, Charles J. "Personal and Professional Integrity in the Legal Profession: Lessons from President Clinton and Kenneth Starr". 56 Washington & Lee Law Review 851 (1999).
 Ogletree, Charles J. "Matthew O. Tobriner Memorial Lecture: The Burdens and Benefits of Race in America". 25 Hastings Constitutional Law Quarterly 219 (1998).
 Ogletree, Charles J. "The President's Role in Bridging America's Racial Divide". 15 Thomas M. Cooley Law Review 11 (1998).
 Ogletree, Charles J. "The Conference on Critical Race Theory: When the Rainbow Is Not Enough". 31 New England Law Review 705 (1997).
 Ogletree, Charles J. "Race Relations and Conflicts in the United States The Limits of Hate Speech: Does Race Matter?" 32 Gonzaga Law Review 491 (1997).

Articles in a Newspaper 
 Ogletree, Charles J. "Court Should Stand By Bake Ruling". Boston Globe. April 1, 2003, Op-Ed.
 Ogletree, Charles J. "The Future of Admissions and Race". Boston Globe. May 20, 2002, Op-Ed.
 Ogletree, Charles J. "Litigating the Legacy of Slavery". The New York Times. March 31, 2002, Op-Ed.
 Ogletree, Charles J. "The U.S. Needn't Shrink from Durban". Los Angeles Times. August 29, 2001, Op-Ed.
 Ogletree, Charles J. "The Real David Brock". Boston Globe. June 30, 2001, Op-Ed.
 Ogletree, Charles J. "The Court's Tarnished Reputation". Boston Globe. December 12, 2000, Op-Ed.
 Ogletree, Charles J. "Why Has the G.O.P. Kept Blacks Off Federal Courts?". The New York Times. August 18, 2000, Op-Ed.

Reports or Studies 
 Ogletree, Charles J. "Judicial Excellence, Judicial Diversity: The African American Federal Judges Report" (2003).

Presentations 
 Ogletree, Charles J. A Call to Arms: Responding to W.E.B. DuBois's Challenge to Wilberforce, Wilberforce University Founder's Day Luncheon (February 11, 2003).
 Ogletree, Charles J. Grinnell College Special Convocation Address (January 22, 2003).
 Ogletree, Charles J. Remembering Dr. King's Legacy: Promoting Diversity and Promoting Patriotism, King County Bar Association MLK Luncheon (January 17, 2003).
 Ogletree, Charles J. Baum Lecture, University of Illinois Urbana-Champaign (November 2002).
 Ogletree, Charles J. University of California-Davis Barrett Lecture: The Current Reparations Debate, University of California-Davis Law School (October 22, 2002).
 Ogletree, Charles J. Why Reparations? Why Now?, Buck Franklin Memorial Lecture and Conference on Reparations, University of Tulsa College of Law, Oklahoma (September 25, 2002).
 Ogletree, Charles J. Northeastern University Valerie Gordon Human Rights Lecture, Northeastern University School of Law (April 2002).
 Ogletree, Charles J. Sobota Lecture, Albany School of Law (Spring 2002).
 Ogletree, Charles J. Mangels Lecturship, University of Washington Graduate School (Spring 2002).

References

Further reading
 Charles Ogletree (Harvard faculty biography) retrieved May 24, 2006.
 Charles Ogletree, Harvard Prof. Henry Louis Gates, Jr.'s Lawyer, An Experienced Litigator, Joel Zand, FindLaw, July 22, 2009
Booklist, April 1, 2004, Vernon Ford, review of All Deliberate Speed: Reflections on the First Half-Century of "Brown v. Board of Education," p. 1336.
Choice, May 1995, D.O. Friedrichs, review of Beyond the Rodney King Story: An Investigation of Police Conduct in Minority Communities, p. 1510.
Kliatt, March 2006, Patricia Moore, review of All Deliberate Speed, p. 40.
Massachusetts Law Review, fall, 2004, Brownlow M. Speer, review of All Deliberate Speed, p. 103.
New Crisis, May–June 2002, Todd Steven Burroughs, "Charles Ogletree on Reparations," p. 9.
New Republic, June 7, 1993, Ruth Shalit, "Hate Story: Racial Strife at Law School," p. 11.
New York Review of Books, September 23, 2004, Kathleen Sullivan, review of All Deliberate Speed, p. 47.
Publishers Weekly, October 31, 1994, review of Beyond the Rodney King Story, p. 49; March 22, 2004, review of All Deliberate Speed, p. 77.
Lawrence-Lightfoot, Sara. I've Known Rivers: Lives of Loss and Liberation, Addison-Wesley, 1994.
 Bay State Banner, April 28, 1994, p. 17.
 Boston Globe, September 9, 2004.
 Jet, June 28, 1993, p. 10.
 The Wall Street Journal, December 4, 1992.

External links
 Ogletree on The Arrest of Henry Louis Gates, Jr. and Race, Class and Crime in America — video by Democracy Now!

 

American legal scholars
African-American legal scholars
African-American lawyers
Harvard Law School faculty
University of Oregon faculty
Public defenders
University of the District of Columbia trustees
People involved in plagiarism controversies
Harvard Law School alumni
Stanford University alumni
People from Merced, California
1952 births
Living people